Zonal Welfare Council is a grassroots NGO based in Kolkata, in the West Bengal state of India. Founded by Shri. Pranab Kumar Chakraborty in 1990, it is currently headed by CEO, Akashdeep Chakraborty. Zonal Welfare Council works mainly in natural resource development and sustainability, village development, women empowerment, early childhood education and health care, continuing education, and children's welfare. Zonal Welfare Council's main working area is Kolkata and South 24 Parganas districts, Zonal Welfare Council is maintaining and running a free orphanage in South 24 Parganas. Zonal Welfare Council, partnered with LetzChange Foundation, Global Stop TB Team, and Human and Child Trafficking movement in India.

Zonal Welfare Council is a nonprofit that provides shelter, food, clothing and nutrition to the street children and orphans.

References

External links

 

Charities based in India
Early childhood education in India
Organisations based in Kolkata
Organizations established in 1990
1990 establishments in West Bengal